The Baluchistan xeric woodlands ecoregion (WWF ID: PA1307) covers the middle elevations of a series of mountain ranges of western Pakistan and northeastern Afghanistan, reaching  from the Arabian Sea in the south to the Hindu Kush Mountains and the Himalayas in the north.  The characteristic vegetation is xeric (dry) woodlands of shrubs and herbaceous cover.  The region has rich biodiversity but relatively few endemic species.

Location and description 
In the south, the ecoregion rises from the coastal ranges into the Makran Range and Kirthar Mountains. It proceeds north through the arid desert of Pakistan's Balochistan Province along the western border of Pakistan, including the Zarghun Ghar Range, Sulaiman Range and Spīn Ghar Mountains into Khyber Pakhtunkhwa Province. Eventually it reaches the base of the Hindu Kush and Himalayas. These mountain ranges are periodically cut by passes and valleys, including the Bolan Pass near Quetta and the Khyber Pass above the Valley of Peshawar.

Along the south-western side of the ecoregion are the very dry South Iran Nubo-Sindian desert and semi-desert and Registan–North Pakistan sandy desert ecoregions of eastern Iran. Further north in Afghanistan is the Central Afghan Mountains xeric woodlands ecoregion (xeric being 'dry').  Along the east side is the Northwestern thorn scrub forests. In the middle of the ecoregion, along the tops of the highest ridges are isolated patches of two wetter ecoregions – the East Afghan montane conifer forests and Sulaiman Range alpine meadows. 

The soils contain gypsum and are classified as pedocals (high in calcium carbonate and low in organic matter).  In the north of the region the soils on the ridges are limestone, clay, gravel and stone.

Climate 
The climate of the ecoregion is Hot semi-arid (Köppen climate classification (BSh)). This climate is characteristic of steppes, with hot summers and cool or mild winters, and minimal precipitation.  The coldest month averages above .  Precipitation averages 150 mm/year.  Hot winds from the north occur in summer, raising dust storms in the south with velocities up to 110 mph.

Flora and fauna 
67% of the territory is bare or sparse vegetation. 9% is shrubland, 8% is herbaceous vegetation, and 9% is cultivated cropland.  Below 1,500 meters, the vegetation is steppe in character.  From 1,500 to 2,000 meters is found montane open forest of Pistachio trees (Pistacia atlantica), Wild almond (of genus Prunus), and Barberry (Berberis).  Lower brush includes Honeysuckle bush (of genus Lonicera), Sage (Artemisia spp.), and Pashtun juniper (Juniperus seravschanica).  At higher altitudes there is a transition zone of sclerophyll trees (woody brush with hard leaves).  At still higher elevations are the isolated alpine meadows of other ecoregions.

While the ecoregion does not support a large number of endemic species, it has a rich biodiversity due to the variety terrain, altitude, and landscape aspect. Over 300 species of bird have been recorded, the majority of which are migratory.

Protected areas 
About 3.3% of the ecoregion is officially protected.  These protected areas include:
 Chinji National Park
 Dhrun National Park 
 Kirthar National Park
 Margalla Hills National Park
 Nuristan National Park
 Sheikh Badin National Park
 Bajwat Wildlife Sanctuary
 Borraka Wildlife Sanctuary
 Chorani Wildlife Sanctuary
 Chumbi Surla Wildlife Sanctuary
 Dureji Wildlife Sanctuary	
 Ghondak Dhono Wildlife Sanctuary
 Islamabad Wildlife Sanctuary
 Khabbeke Lake Wildlife Sanctuary
 Koh-e-Geish Wildlife Sanctuary
 Kolwah Kap Wildlife Sanctuary
 Mahal Kohistan Wildlife Sanctuary
 Manglot Wildlife Sanctuary
 Maslakh Wildlife Sanctuary
 Ras Koh Wildlife Sanctuary
 Raghai Rakhshan Wildlife Sanctuary	
 Rasool Barrage Wildlife Sanctuary
 Shashan Wildlife Sanctuary
 Ziarat Juniper Wildlife Sanctuary

References 

Palearctic ecoregions
Deserts and xeric shrublands
Ecoregions of Pakistan
Ecoregions of Afghanistan